The Division of Melbourne Ports was an Australian federal electoral division in the inner south-eastern suburbs of Melbourne, Victoria, Australia. It was located to the south of Melbourne's central business district and covered an area of approximately 40 km2 around the north and north-eastern shores of Port Phillip Bay.

The electorate was created at the time of Australian Federation in 1901 and was one of the original 65 divisions contested at the first federal election. It is named for the fact that, at the time of its creation, it was centred on Port Melbourne and Williamstown, both major ports.

The electorate, formerly working class, was much more demographically diverse on its final boundaries, with rapidly accelerating inner-city gentrification and high-density housing developments in later years. It included Port Melbourne, but also included a number of middle and upper middle class suburbs such as Albert Park, Balaclava, Caulfield, Elwood, Middle Park, Ripponlea, South Melbourne and St Kilda. It was notable for having one of Australia's larger Jewish populations, at 9.9%, much higher than the nationwide 0.4%. It also had a high proportion of atheists and agnostics, with 38.8% of residents answering "No Religion" in the 2016 census, compared to 30.1% nationwide. It also had a large gay and lesbian community.

History

Melbourne Ports was held by the Australian Labor Party from 1906 until 2019, when it was renamed. During this period it was held by only five members, all men, most notably Jack Holloway, a minister who served under John Curtin and Ben Chifley; Frank Crean, Treasurer and then Deputy Prime Minister in the Whitlam Government; and Clyde Holding, a minister in the Hawke Government who prior to switching to federal politics had served as Victorian Opposition Leader from 1967 to 1977.

Originally, it was anchored in the industrial suburbs in the west of the electorate, which are part of Labor's heartland in west Melbourne.  On those boundaries, for decades it was one of the safest Labor seats in the country, and Labor usually easily retained it even during severe nationwide defeats for Labor. Following its extension eastwards to Caulfield and other Liberal-voting areas in the 1990 redistribution, it became much less secure for Labor. Continuing the gradual downwards trend in the Labor primary vote, in the 2013 election, Labor was returned with a primary vote of less than 32 percent. In 2016, Labor actually suffered a primary vote swing of four percent and a two-party swing of two percent even as it nearly reduced the Coalition to minority government nationally.

In 2018, the Australian Electoral Commission proposed renaming Melbourne Ports as Macnamara, after medical scientist Dame Jean Macnamara. The new name was gazetted on 13 July 2018, and was first used at the 2019 federal election.

Members

Election results

References

External links
Division of Melbourne Ports - Australian Electoral Commission

Former electoral divisions of Australia
Constituencies established in 1901
Constituencies disestablished in 2019
1901 establishments in Australia